José Santos Ortiz Asencio, known as Santos Ortiz (born 22 January 1990) is a Salvadoran footballer who plays as a midfielder for Primera División club Águila.

International
He made his El Salvador national football team debut on 30 August 2014 in a friendly against Dominican Republic.

He was selected for the 2019 CONCACAF Gold Cup squad.

References

External links
 

1990 births
People from San Miguel, El Salvador
Living people
Salvadoran footballers
El Salvador international footballers
Association football midfielders
C.D. Dragón footballers
C.D. Águila footballers
Primera División de Fútbol Profesional players
2019 CONCACAF Gold Cup players